Rockin' Every Night – Live in Japan is a live album recorded by Gary Moore at Tokyo Kōsei Nenkin Kaikan in 1983, during the Corridors of Power tour. Despite being released in Japan in 1983, it was not given a European release until 1986. The 2002 CD reissue included three live tracks recorded at the Marquee in London on 26 August 1982, originally from a bonus EP included with the first 25,000 vinyl copies of Moore's earlier album Corridors of Power.

The song "Sunset", which had been a staple of Moore's live setlist since 1980, is dedicated to the late Randy Rhoads, who had died several months prior. It was finally recorded in the studio in 1982, for Cozy Powell's Tilt album. Keyboardist Don Airey had previously recorded and performed with Rhoads in Ozzy Osbourne's backing band during the Diary of a Madman tour.

Track listing

Personnel
Musicians
Gary Moore – guitars, lead vocals on tracks 2, 3 and 7, backing vocals
John Sloman – lead vocals on tracks 1, 3, 4 and 6, backing vocals, keyboards
Don Airey – keyboards
Neil Murray – bass
Ian Paice – drums, percussion

Production
Nigel Walker – producer, engineer

Charts

References

1983 live albums
Gary Moore live albums
Virgin Records live albums